William Forbes McIntosh (2 January 1879 – 15 January 1973) was a Scottish footballer who played as a left back or left half.

He played club football for Third Lanark and Vale of Leven, and made one appearance for Scotland in 1905. With Third Lanark, McIntosh won the Scottish Football League title in 1903–04 and the Scottish Cup in 1905. He later emigrated to Canada.

References

1879 births
1973 deaths
Footballers from Stirling
Scottish footballers
Scotland international footballers
Third Lanark A.C. players
King's Park F.C. players
East Stirlingshire F.C. players
Vale of Leven F.C. players
Fulham F.C. players
Association football fullbacks
Association football wing halves
Scottish Football League players
English Football League players
Place of death missing
Scottish emigrants to Canada